Gian Paolo Barbieri (or Giampaolo Barbieri) (born 1938) is an Italian fashion photographer.

Biography 
Born on the Via Mazzini in Milan, Barbieri's family were fabric wholesalers, and his father owned a department store. He performed in amateur dramatics in the mid-1950s, forming "The Trio", a performance troupe with his friends. Barbieri also had a non-speaking role in Luchino Visconti's film Medea. He was influenced by cinema at an early age and photographed models in 1960s Rome, part of the social scene that was portrayed in Federico Fellini's 1960 film La Dolce Vita.

A self-taught photographer, his first professional work was an apprenticeship to the Harper's Bazaar photographer Tom Kublin, who died twenty days later. In 1963 Barbieri had some images published in the Italian fashion magazine Novità, which became Vogue Italia in 1965. Barbieri also shot for the American and French editions of Vogue.

The role of fashion editor had not been fully created in the 1960s, and Barbieri had to find the best setting for his photographs and create the hairstyles, makeup, and jewellery. This could lead to the use of unusual materials, a notable example being earrings made with table tennis balls painted in a mother-of-pearl colour.

Barbieri opened his own studio in Milan in 1964, and began to work closely with ready-to-wear fashion designers a few years later. His creative relationship with Walter Albini led to an appreciation of the role of the stylist, and Barbieri and the fashion designer Valentino were responsible for innovations in modern fashion advertising campaigns. Notable models that Barbieri has photographed include Mirella Petteni, Jerry Hall, Veruschka, Monica Bellucci and Audrey Hepburn. Barbieri has worked for fashion designers Armani, Versace and Ferré, and Dolce & Gabbana, Pomellato, and Giuseppe Zanotti.

In the 1990s Barbieri became a travel photographer. An exhibition of Barbieri's work was curated by the English fashion photographer David Bailey, shown at the Victoria and Albert Museum in London and the Kunstforum in Vienna.

Barbieri photographs in analog and does not retouch his pictures. One of his early cameras was a Reflex Voigtländer 35mm. In 1968 he was awarded the Biancamano Prize as Best Italian Photographer and was named one of the 14 best international fashion photographers by the German magazine Stern in 1978.

Books
Fiori della mia vita, Silvana (2016)
Flowers, Silvana (2016)
Skin, Silvana (2015)
Dark Memories, Skira (2013)
Gian Paolo Barbieri, Federico Motta (2007)
Catalogo Mostra Palazzo Reale (2007)
Body Haiku, Dolci Japan gallery (2007)
Sud, Pomellato (2006)
Exotic Nudes, Taschen (2003)
Innatural, Contrasto (2001)
A History of Fashion, Photology (2001)
Equator, Taschen (1999)
Tahiti Tattoos No. 2, Taschen (1998)
Madagascar, Taschen (1997)
Pappa e Ciccia, Pappa & Ciccia Editori (1991)
The maps of desire, Pomellato (1989)
Tahiti Tattoos No. 1, Fabbri (1989)
Barbieri, Fabbri (1988)
Venti Anni di Vogue Italia 1964-1984, Edizioni Condé Nast (1984)
Silent Portraits, Massimo Baldini (1984)
I grandi fotografi, gruppo editoriale Fabbri (1982)
Artificial, FotoSelex (1982)

Publications 

 Novità
 1963 : July, November
 1964 : February, July, September, October, November
 1965 : September
 Vogue Italia
 1965 : November (Isa Stoppi), December (Mirella Petteni)
 1966 : January, February, November, December
 1967 : November, December
 1968 : January, February, April, May, June, September, October
 1969 : January, February, March, July
 1971 : April
 1972 : May, October, December
 1973 : giugno, September, October, December
 1974 : March, giugno, September, November
 1975 : March, April, June, September, October, November, December
 1976 : September, October, December
 1977 : March, April, May, November, December
 1978 : aprile, May, June, November, December
 1979 : January, March, July, December
 1980 : February, March, May, June, October, December
 1981 : February, May, September, October, December
 1982 : giugno, September
 1983 : January
 1985 : March
 2013 : March

 Linea Italiana 
 1966 : Spring-Summer
 1967 : Autumn-Winter
 1968 : Spring-Summer

 Vogue Paris 
 1974 : June

 Vogue Giappone
 2017 : January

 Progresso Fotografico
 1981 : January

 Photo Italia 
 1989 : number 165
 1990 : number 180
 2001 : number 11

 iO Donna
 1997 : March, April, July
 1998 : July, November
 1999 : December

 GQ 
 2000 : July, September, October, November
 2001 : February, March, August, September, October, November
 2002 : June, July
 2003 : January, March, maggio, November
 2004 : February, June
 2005 : April, May, August, November
 2006 : February, May
 2014 : July

 GQ Russia
 2011 : March

 Vanity Fair
 2004 : March, May
 2005 : maggio, October
 2006 : July, November
 2008 : agosto, September
 2009 : July

 Glamour
 2015 : October

References

External links
Official website
 London: ‘Follow your own style’ on British Journal of Photography
 Biography of Gian Paolo Barbieri

Living people
1938 births
Photographers from Milan
Fashion photographers
Travel photographers
Vogue (magazine) people